The Petroleum Street Bridge is a girder bridge connecting the North Side and South Side neighborhoods of Oil City, Pennsylvania and crosses the Allegheny River. The bridge sits just downstream from the confluence of Oil Creek and the Allegheny River. The 1995 structure carries two lanes of U.S. Route 62 and was built during a decade of major refurbishments of Upper Allegheny crossings. Previously, a 1910 truss bridge stood on the site; this structure replaced an earlier wooden bridge.

See also
List of crossings of the Allegheny River

References
Nat'l Bridges

Bridges over the Allegheny River
Bridges completed in 1995
Bridges in Venango County, Pennsylvania
Road bridges in Pennsylvania
U.S. Route 62
Bridges of the United States Numbered Highway System
Girder bridges in the United States